The Ghana Women’s Premier League (GWPL), currently known as the Malta Guinness Women's Premier League for sponsorship reasons, was launched in 2012 as the National Women's League (NWL) and is the top division league for women's football in Ghana. Contested by 18 clubs in two zones (southern and northern zone), it operates on a system of promotion and relegation with the Ghana Women's Division One. Seasons run from December to July with each team playing 16 matches (playing all 8 other teams in their zone both home and away). Most games are played on Saturday and Sunday afternoons.

In November 2021, Hilary Boateng was appointed by the Ghana Football Association as the chairperson of the Women's Premier League Committee.

History
Up to 2006, only some regional areas had active women's football leagues. In 2006, a zonal league was created, that played out a national champion for the first time. Ghana was divided into three zones that played a league stage. Each zone then advanced two teams to a national stage.

The current format was first played in 2012–13. The league is played in two divisions. After the league stage, both division winners meet in a championship final. The first final was won by Hasaacas Ladies 2–1 over Fabulous Ladies at the Accra Sports Stadium. A large part of the football equipment was sponsored by FIFA.

2012–13 founding teams
The twelve teams of the initial season were divided into two zones of six teams.

2020–present 
In 2021, the Executive Council of the Ghana Football Association decided to expand the League from its current format 16 clubs to 18 clubs beginning from the 2021–22 season, meaning nine teams for the respective zones to allow for a minimum of 16 league matches in a season.

Competition format

Competition 
There are 16 clubs in the Women's Premier League, 8 in the southern zone and 8 in the northern zone. During the course of a season (from December to July) each club in each zone plays the others twice (a double round-robin system), once at their home stadium and once at that of their opponents', for 16 games in each zone making it 32 games all together. Teams receive three points for a win and one point for a draw. No points are awarded for a loss. Teams are ranked by total points, then goal difference, and then goals scored. If still equal, teams are deemed to occupy the same position. At the end of the zonal league both top placed clubs and zonal winners meet in a championship final to decide the national champion.

Promotion and relegation 
A system of promotion and relegation exists between the Premier League and the Division One League. The lowest placed teams in both zones of the Premier League are relegated to the Division One League, and the top teams from both zones in the Championship promoted to the Premier League. The number of clubs was increased from 16 to 18 in 2021–22 season.

Championship finals
The list of champions and runners-ups:

2019*** Ghana Women's Special Competition

Winners by club

Sponsorship 
From its inception, the league did not have a title sponsor and was simply referred to as National Women’s League. In 2018, FreshPak, a subsidiary of Groupe Nduom, were announced as the league's first ever title sponsor worth GH¢500,000 over the next two seasons.

On 5 August 2022, the Ghana Football Association announced Malta Guinness as the league's title sponsor worth GH¢10 million for three years from the 2022–23 season onwards.

Electroland Ghana Ltd, distributors of NASCO electronic appliances, has been a partner and sponsor of the Women's Premier League since 2019–20 season. The company sponsors the Player of the Match award, the monthly awards which includes the Player of the month and Coach of the month awards along with the annual and end of the season awards Player of the season, Top Scorer, Discovery of the year award, Best Goalkeeper and Coach of the season awards.

In October 2020, the GFA signed a four-year partnership deal with Decathlon Ghana which includes Decathlon providing 1,000 Kipsta balls and other complementary sports products per year to the league from the 2020–21 season onwards.

In February 2022, online gambling company Betway signed a sponsorship deal with the Ghana Football Association as a Development Partner of the Ghana Women's Premier League. As a development partner, amongst their roles would be to provide a season-long mentorship and leadership programme for officials, administrators and coaches of the women's football clubs. Betway also provides training equipment and warm-up kits to all participating clubs in the GWPL. The sponsorship was extended in February 2023.

Media coverage 
In February 2020, the Ghana Football Association signed a broadcasting right sponsorship deal with StarTimes Television for six years starting from the 2019–20 Ghana Premier League season. As part of the deal StarTimes dedicated $100,000 in the first year as a visibility support to both the Ghana Division One League and women's football especially the Ghana Women's Premier League. They dedicated $50,000 for the following five years.

As part of the deal, StarTimes Sports and shareholders Max TV broadcast both the 2020–21 Ghana Women's Premier League Final and 2020–21 Ghana Women's FA Cup Final.

See also
Women's football in Ghana
Ghana Women's FA Cup
Ghana Women's Super Cup

References

External links
League at Federation website

Women's association football leagues in Africa
women
1
Women's sports leagues in Ghana
Women's football competitions in Ghana